Camellocossus is a genus of moths in the family Cossidae.

Species
 Camellocossus abyssinica
 Camellocossus henleyi
 Camellocossus osmanya

References

 , 2011: Catalogue of the Family Cossidae of the Old World. Neue Entomologische Nachrichten, 66: 1-129.

Cossinae
Moth genera